Dirksia is a genus of araneomorph spiders in the family Cybaeidae, and was first described by R. V. Chamberlin & Wilton Ivie in 1942 as a subgenus of Ethobuella. Originally placed with the funnel weavers, it was elevated to genus and moved to the dwarf sheet spiders in 1967, then moved to the Cybaeidae in 2017.  it contains only two species: D. cinctipes and D. pyrenaea.

References

Araneomorphae genera
Cybaeidae
Hahniidae
Spiders of North America